Tigrioides phaeola is a moth in the family Erebidae. It was described by George Hampson in 1900. It is found in Sri Lanka and India (Mumbai).

References

Moths described in 1900
Lithosiina